The Mullumbimby Star was a newspaper published in Mullumbimby, New South Wales, Australia under various names from 1902 to 1982.

History
The Mullumbimby Star was first published in 1902 in Mullumbimby, New South Wales by J.H. Plowright. The paper was published under several names during its history.

Digitisation
This paper has been digitised as part of the Australian Newspapers Digitisation Program project of the National Library of Australia.

See also
 List of newspapers in Australia
 List of newspapers in New South Wales

References

External links
 
 

Defunct newspapers published in New South Wales
Newspapers on Trove